Aarthi Agarwal (March 5, 1984 – June 6, 2015) was an Indian-American actress who primarily worked in Telugu cinema.

Early life and career 
Agarwal was born on March 5, 1984, in New Jersey to Gujarati parents. Her younger sister Aditi Agarwal is also an actress in Telugu film industry. At around 14 years of age, actor Suniel Shetty spotted her and invited her to dance on stage in Philadelphia, Pennsylvania. After the performance, he asked her father to encourage her to take up acting in Bollywood. At age 16, she made her debut with Paagalpan.

Agarwal made her Telugu film debut in Nuvvu Naaku Nachav with actor Venkatesh. She was one of the few non-Telugu speaking actresses to work with noted Indian film stars Chiranjeevi, Nandamuri Balakrishna, Nagarjuna, Venkatesh, Prabhas, Mahesh Babu, Ravi Teja, and Jr NTR.

In 2005, media reported that Agarwal had attempted suicide over the failure of a romantic relationship with a co-star.
In 2006, following an accident at home, she was hospitalized with internal head injuries at Apollo Hospital, Jubilee Hills, Hyderabad and put on ventilator support.

In 2007, Agarwal married a software engineer; the couple divorced in 2009.

Death 

On June 6, 2015, Agarwal was pronounced dead on arrival at AtlantiCare Regional Medical Center in Atlantic City, New Jersey. Agarwal, who had undergone a liposuction surgery six weeks prior, had severe breathing problems before her death. Her manager stated the cause of her death was cardiac arrest. She had been living with her parents in Egg Harbor Township.

Filmography 
 All Films are in Telugu, unless otherwise noted.

References

External links 
 

Place of birth missing
1984 births
2015 deaths
Actresses from New Jersey
People from Egg Harbor Township, New Jersey
Actresses from Mumbai
American film actresses
American people of Gujarati descent
American actresses of Indian descent
American expatriate actresses in India
Actresses in Hindi cinema
Actresses in Telugu cinema
Actresses in Tamil cinema
Gujarati people
CineMAA Awards winners
21st-century American actresses